The State Council of Sikkim was the legislative body of the erstwhile Kingdom of Sikkim, which was located in the Himalayas, between India and China.

There were six elections held for the council between 1953 and 1974. In 1975, after a referendum to abolish the monarchy, and the passing of the 36th amendment to the Indian constitution, the monarchy was abolished, along with the State council, and its members at the time, were deemed to be the Legislative Assembly of the new state of Sikkim, within India.

Structure
The council was composed of some elected members, and some who were nominated by the Chogyal. After the 1973 election, the composition was changed and the appointments by the Chogyal were eliminated, while at the same time the number of seats in the council were increased.
The Dewan of Sikkim (a Government of India appointed position) was the President of the council.

Executive Council
From among the State Council members, an Executive Council was chosen, by the Chogyal. They were given individual responsibilities within government and were equivalent to a cabinet of ministers. This too was presided over by the Dewan of Sikkim.

History
The State Council of Sikkim existed since at least the late 19th Century. It was an advisory and executive body, and was presided by the Chogyal (King). After the Independence of neighbouring India in August 1947, various political bodies in Sikkim began to demand greater say in the working of the kingdom. In 1952, the Chogyal conceded and announced new constituencies, for an election in 1953. 

The Chogyal agreed to have 12 (out of 18) seats on the council, be electable. The other six were appointed by the Chogyal. Under a parity formula agreed upon by the political groups, 6 of the electable seats were to be for the Sikkim Nepalis and the other 6 for the Bhutia-Lepcha (BL) people. There were 4 constituencies drawn up of the kingdom, and elections were to be held in 1953. In the 1953 election, all the Nepali-reserved seats were won by the Sikkim National Party, whie the BL-reserved seats were won by the Sikkim State Congress.

Although the term of the council was set as three years, the Chogyal decided to extend the term of the first Council, until 1958. Due to requests from the monastery associations, and other groups, the number of electable seats on the council was increased by two, one for the Sangha, to be voted on by the monks, and one seat that wasn't reserved for any particular group. In the elections of 1958, the Sikkim State Congress won one more seat than before, while the unreserved seat was won by an Independent.

The second council's term was due to end in 1961, but the outbreak of the Sino-Indian war led to the extension of its term till 1967. Before the 1967 election, the constituencies were redrawn and increased to five, and four more electable seats were added to the council, one each for the Sikkim Nepalis and the Bhutia-Lepcha, one for the Tsong, and one for people of the Scheduled Castes. This setup remained for the next three elections (1967, 1970 and 1973).

After the 1973 elections, the Sikkim National Congress and Sikkim Janata Congress claimed that vote rigging took place in the South Sikkim constituency. They demanded that officials involved be arrested, but these demands were not met, leading to protests. The unrest led to the signing of a tripartite agreement, on 8 May, between the Choygal, Sikkimese political parties, and the government of India. The agreement led to the establishment of a government, supervised by a Chief Executive, who was nominated by the Indian government. It also necessitated another delimitation exercise, where the Chogyal-appointed seats in the council were abolished, the State Council was renamed to the Sikkim Assembly, and thirty-one new constituencies were drawn, along with 1 constituency for the monasteries (Sangha). Keeping to the parity formula of 1952, 15 of the constituencies were reserved for the Bhutia-Lepcha, and 15 for the Sikkim-Nepalis. The other remaining constituency was for the Scheduled Castes. The principle of "one-man one-vote" was applied. In the 1974 election, the Sikkim National Congress (which was in favour of Sikkim's merger with India), won an absolute majority with 31 of the 32 seats.

Final years (1974–75)

The new government sought an increase in civil and political liberties, but was suppressed by the Chogyal.

 May 1974: The council passed the Government of Sikkim Act, which provided for responsible government, and furthering relations with India. 
 4 July: The council adopted a new constitution, that provided for the country becoming a state of India, which the Chogyal signed, under pressure from India.
 4 September: The Indian Lok Sabha voted in favour of making Sikkim an "associate" state, with the Rajya Sabha voting for an amendment on 8 September, giving it a status equal to that of other states, and absorbing it in the Indian Union. On 8 September 1974, the Chogyal called for a free and fair referendum.
 5 March 1975: The Sikkim National Congress repeated its calls for integration into India, whilst the Chogyal again called for a referendum.
 9 April: Indian troops entered the country, disarmed the palace guard (killing one of them, and injuring four others) and surrounded the palace, putting the king under house-arrest.
 10 April: The Assembly passed a Bill, declaring the office of the Chogyal as abolished, and called for a referendum on this issue, which was set for 14 April.
 14 April: In the referendum, more than 97% of the votes were for abolishing the monarchy.
 26 April: The Indian parliament passed the 36th amendment to the constitution, which transformed Sikkim from an Indian protectorate to a new state within the Indian union.

 15 May Indian President Fakhruddin Ali Ahmed ratified the constitutional amendment (36th) that made Sikkim the 22nd state of India, and abolished the position of the Chogyal. The State Council was considered to be dissolved, and its members were deemed to be the new Legislative Assembly of Sikkim.
 16 May: B. B. Lal took charge as Governor of the state, and swore in Kazi Lhendup Dorjee as the Chief Minister.

Electoral history

Constituencies

See also
 History of Sikkim#Independent monarchy
 List of heads of government of the Kingdom of Sikkim
 Bombay Legislative Assembly
 Tripura Territorial Council

References

External links

 

Defunct unicameral legislatures
1975 disestablishments in Asia
Parliaments by country
Kingdom of Sikkim